The Red Petticoat is a 1912 musical-comedy in 3 acts with book and lyrics by Rida Johnson Young and Paul West, music by Jerome Kern, and directed by Joseph W. Herbert. The Western-genre musical starred Helen Lowell as tough lady barber Sophie Brush in the rough silver-mining town of Lost River, Nevada, who gets her man. Songs included "I Wonder", "My Peaches and Cream", "Oh You Beautiful Spring", "The Ragtime Restaurant", and "Since the Days of Grandmamma". The musical was based on a 1911 farcical melodrama by Young titled Next!. It was Kern's first complete score.

It opened at Daly's 30th St. Theatre on 13 November 1912 and moved to the Broadway Theatre, closing on January 4, 1913, after 61 performances.

References

External links
The Red Petticoat at the Internet Broadway Database

1912 musicals